Syed Nuruddin Munaim is a Bangladeshi writer.

Career 
In 1980, Munaim was the Press Counsellor at the Embassy of Bangladesh in Washington DC.

Munaim was awarded the Ekushey Padak, the second highest civilian award in Bangladesh, in 1983 for his contribution to journalism in Bangladesh.

Personal life 
Munaim's son, Syed Fahim Munaim, was a notable journalist in Bangladesh.

References 

Bangladeshi journalists
Recipients of the Ekushey Padak
Bangladeshi diplomats
Year of birth missing
Year of death missing